"Hatsukoi" is a song by Japanese-American singer-songwriter Hikaru Utada. It is their fifth single under the label Epic Records Japan and was taken from their upcoming seventh Japanese-language studio album Hatsukoi. The song was released as a digital download on May 30 and was used as a tie-in for the Japanese television drama Hana Nochi Hare - Hanadan Next Season. It's the second song that Utada delivers to the series, after Flavor of Life in 2007.

The song and "First Love" from her 1999 album of the same name inspired the 2022 Netflix series First Love. In December 2022, "Hatsukoi" was remastered alongside "First Love" in Dolby Atmos.

Music video
The song's corresponding promo video is directed by Yasuhito Tsuge, the same director that worked with Utada on the "Manatsu no Tooriame" music video. Released on the same day as the song, it can be purchased via iTunes store, and has simultaneously been released for rotation to Japanese TV Station M-On. Following the good reception of the "Forevermore" and "Anata" music video documentaries with M-On, a new one will be exhibited at the channel on June 27, the same day of Hatsukoi album release.

Commercial performance
The song topped the Oricon download chart for 2 consecutive weeks, making Hikaru Utada the only female singer to reach the top of the chart 3 times since its beginning.

Track listing

Charts

Weekly charts

Year-end charts

Sales and certifications

Release history

References

Hikaru Utada songs
Songs written by Hikaru Utada
2018 songs
2018 singles
Epic Records singles